13 Blues for Thirteen Moons is the fifth full-length album by the Canadian post-rock group, Thee Silver Mt. Zion Memorial Orchestra & Tra-La-La Band. The album was released in March 2008. The album consists of an instrumental feedback intro, split into twelve extremely short tracks, and four full songs, which had been played live on recent tours.

The liner notes are found in the CD booklet titled —Spanish for "Hymns of Zion". The booklet also contains lyric sheets, presented in the block-capital handwriting familiar with owners of other Silver Mt. Zion records. As such, this is the first album package by the band to contain conventional lyrics.

Track listing

Personnel
Thee Silver Mt. Zion Memorial Orchestra & Tra-La-La Band
 Thierry Amar – contrabass, electric bass, vocals
 Eric Craven – drums, vocals
 Beckie Foon – cello, vocals
 Ian Ilavsky – guitar, organ
 Efrim Menuck – guitar, vocals
 Jessica Moss – violin, vocals
 Sophie Trudeau – violin, vocals

Additional musicians
 Brian Lipson – trumpet on "13 Blues for Thirteen Moons"
 Nadia Moss – organ on "13 Blues for Thirteen Moons"

Technical
 Howard Bilerman – production
 Radwan Moumneh – production
 Harris Newman – mastering

References

2008 albums
Thee Silver Mt. Zion albums
Constellation Records (Canada) albums
Albums produced by Howard Bilerman
Art rock albums by Canadian artists